Edward Darnley (29 January 1859 – 25 June 1927) was an English-born Australian politician.

He was born in Birmingham to building contractor Edward Darnley and Anna Worrall. He left school at eleven, eventually becoming a plasterer. In 1885 he moved to New South Wales, where he became president of the New South Wales Plasterers' Society. On 2 December 1885 he married Eliza Ann Wild; they had nine children. In 1891 Darnley was elected to the New South Wales Legislative Assembly for Balmain, representing the new Labor Party. He refused to sign the pledge and contested the 1894 election as an independent free trade candidate, but was defeated. Darnley died at Leichhardt in 1927.

References

 

1859 births
1927 deaths
Members of the New South Wales Legislative Assembly
Australian Labor Party members of the Parliament of New South Wales